Susan Long may refer to:
Susan Long (journalist)
Susan Long (skier) (born 1960), American cross country skier
Susan Long (American Dragon: Jake Long)